Pillars Fund is a grant-making organization and Muslim community foundation named in reference to the five pillars of Islam, the third of which is Zakat.

Founded in 2010 in the mold of United Way and Jewish Federations of North America, and headquartered in Chicago, Illinois, Pillars is focused on funding secular non-profit programs supporting American Muslims in media, public relations, and leadership development. It is one of the largest funders of Muslim issues in the United States.

Governance
Pillars Fund is governed by a Board of Advisors, many of whom are prominent American Muslims. The organization makes particular effort to ensure that donations go to projects that would not elicit controversy.

Executive Directors
 Kashif Shaikh (2010–present)

Fundraising
Pillars Fund was founded as a giving circle  housed under the Chicago Community Trust in 2010 and became an independent entity in 2016. It raised a million dollars in 2016.

Institutional funders
Ford Foundation
Nathan Cummings Foundation
Open Society Foundations
W. K. Kellogg Foundation

Spending
Pillars Fund funds a variety of approaches towards its stated goal of "amplifying the leadership, narratives and talents of American Muslims," with stated program areas of rights, wellness, understanding and leadership.

As of 2017, it had invested more than $2 million in such programs, and expects to award $700,000 in 2017. It receives typically awards fifteen of the hundreds of grant applications it receives each year.

Grantees
Auburn Theological Seminary's "Voices of Change, Voices of America" Program
Hartford Seminary's Islamic Chaplaincy Program
Institute for Social Policy and Understanding
Unity Productions Foundation

References

External links
 Pillars Fund website
 Halal in the Family: Challenging hate—pop culture and philanthropy

Social welfare charities based in the United States
Islamic charities based in the United States
Organizations established in 2010
2010 establishments in Illinois